Colette Cassidy is a television news reporter, journalist, writer, and speaker.

Career
Cassidy served as primetime newsbreak anchor for MSNBC as well as an occasional host of MSNBC Live. Previously, she was a reporter and weekend anchor at CBS station KYW-TV in Philadelphia, where she  
joined the station as a writer and producer in 1994. By December 1995, she had moved on to general assignment and in December 2002, she was promoted to the anchor seat.

Personal
She is a New Jersey native, who was raised outside of Dublin, Ireland. She is a graduate of Marywood University in Scranton, Pennsylvania. Cassidy is an Alzheimer's awareness raising advocate and fundraises for the Alzheimer's Association.

References

External links
Colette Cassidy on Twitter

Living people
American television news anchors
Marywood University alumni
Year of birth missing (living people)